Somavarappadu is a village in Eluru district of the Indian state of Andhra Pradesh. It is located to the north of district headquarters Eluru at a distance of 6 km. It is under Eluru revenue division.

Demographics 

 Census of India, Somavarappadu has population of 3,015 of which 1,531 are males while 1,484 are females. Sex Ratio of Somavarappadu village is 969. Population of children with age 0-6 is 313 which makes up 10.38% of total population of village with a sex ratio of 830. Literacy rate of Somavarappadu village was 70.2%.

References

Villages in Eluru district